Galahs in the Gidgee is the first album released by Colin Buchanan in 1991. Produced by John Kane for the ABC Records label, the album is considered Buchanan's breakthrough album, earning him several Australian Country Music Award nominations and his first winning award for New Talent of the Year for the album.

All of the songs on the album relate to the Australian Outback, the people who live there and local customs. Inspiration came to Buchanan while he lived in Bourke in country New South Wales as quoted in the liner notes of the album.

The album was dedicated to Bill Vincent.

Album cover
The album cover features Buchanan in front of a stereotypical Australian country outback backdrop setting. It was photographed by Michael Saggus and designed by Deborah Parry.

Track listing
All songs by Colin Buchanan.

"Galahs in the Gidgee" – 3:22
"Uncle Viv" – 3:44
"Frank the Scab" – 3:20
"Harvest" – 3:38
"She Waits" – 4:17
"The Debutantes' Ball" – 3:40
"Farm Cars" – 1:52
"Come What May" – 3:00
"Time For A Yarn" – 4:05
"Singlets Blue" – 3:30
"Progress" – 4:46

Personnel 

Colin Buchanan: vocals, acoustic guitar, harmonica.
John Kane: acoustic guitar, mandolin.
Graham Thompson: bass.
Hanuman Dass: drums, shelf, fire extinguisher.
Michael Vidale: acoustic bass.
Genni Kane: harmony vocals.
Ian Simpson: harmony vocals, acoustic guitar, banjo.
Colin Watson: electric guitar.
Michel Rose: steel guitar, dobro.
Michael Kerin: fiddle.
Larry Muhoberac: accordion.

Notes

External links
 Galahs in the Gidgee at colinbuchanan.com.au

1991 albums
ABC Records albums